Shapi Leima (Shabi Leima) or Sapi Leima (Sabi Leima) is the goddess of rodents in Meitei mythology and religion. She is a sister of goddesses Khunu Leima and Nganu Leima. Legend says that all three sisters married the same mortal man.

Etymology 
The Meitei female given name "Sapi Leima" (ꯁꯄꯤ ꯂꯩꯃ) or "Sabi Leima" (ꯁꯕꯤ ꯂꯩꯃ) is made up of two component words. The two words are "Shapi/Sapi/Shabi/Sabi" (ꯁꯕꯤ) and "Leima" (ꯂꯩꯃ). "Sabi" (ꯁꯕꯤ) is a rat like animal. It lives in the clumps of bamboos. It is known for having sharp teeth. The word "Leima" (ꯂꯩꯃ) is further made up of two component words, "Lei" (ꯂꯩ) and "Ma" (ꯃ). "Lei" (ꯂꯩ) means land or earth. "Ma" (ꯃ) means "mother". Literally, "Leima" (ꯂꯩꯃ) can be translated as "Land Mother" or "Mother Earth". But in general context, "Leima" (ꯂꯩꯃ) means a queen or a mistress or a lady.

Description 
Shapi Leima (Shabi Leima) is described as the mistress of all the rodents of the world. At any time, she could summon all the rodents at any place she wishes. She is the youngest daughter of the  god Salailen (alias Soraren).

See also 
 Ireima (Ereima), Meitei goddess of water 
 Leimarel (Leimalel), Meitei goddess of earth
 Ngaleima, Meitei goddess of fish
 Phouoibi (Phouleima), Meitei goddess of agricultural crops
 Thumleima, Meitei goddess of salt

References

Bibliography 
 Glimpses of Manipuri Culture - Dr. Yumlembam Gopi Devi
 The History of Manipur: An early period - Wahengbam Ibohal Singh · 1986

External links 

 

Abundance deities
Abundance goddesses
Animal deities
Animal goddesses
Arts deities
Arts goddesses
Beauty deities
Beauty goddesses
Dance deities
Dance goddesses
Fertility deities
Fertility goddesses
Fortune deities
Fortune goddesses
Leima
Love and lust deities
Love and lust goddesses
Magic deities
Magic goddesses
Maintenance deities
Maintenance goddesses
Marriage deities
Marriage goddesses
Meitei deities
Music and singing deities
Music and singing goddesses
Names of God in Sanamahism
Nature deities
Nature goddesses
Pastoral deities
Pastoral goddesses
Peace deities
Peace goddesses
Savior deities
Savior goddesses
Time and fate deities
Time and fate goddesses
Trickster deities
Trickster goddesses